Sangzi Town is a town of Xinhua County in Hunan, China. The town was reformed through the amalgamation of the three townships of Sangzi, Pingxi and Zhegu in 1995.

The town is located in the east of the county, it is bordered by Zuoshi Township and Tianping Town to the north, by Lengshuijiang City to the east, by the subdistrict of Fenglin and the town of Shichongkou to the south, by the subdistrict of Shangdu to the west. The town has 29 villages and two communities under its jurisdiction in 2017.

Administrative division
In 2017, the town of Sangzi transferred Xiangrong Village to Fenglin Subdistrict, the town has 29 villages and two communities under its jurisdiction.

2 communities
 Dashu Community
 Sangshu Community

29 villages
 Daping Village
 Datian Village
 Dazao Village
 Dongsha Village
 Hongchao Village
 Huoxing Village
 Jiaqiao Village
 Jinqiao Village
 Jiyun Village
 Jizhong Village
 Juxing Village
 Lixiqiao Village
 Manshanjian Village
 Manshentang Village
 Manzhu Village
 Pingxi Village
 Pingyan Village
 Qingfeng Village
 Qingshan Village
 Shatian Village
 Shijiao Village
 Songjiaqiao Village
 Tangchong Village
 Tianzhuang Village
 Xijiangwan Village
 Xinxing Village
 Yunyu Village
 Zengjia Village
 Zhemu Village

Xiangrong Village
 Xiangrong Village was moved to Shangmei Town, soon transferred to Fenglin Subdistrict in November 2017.

References

External links

Divisions of Xinhua County